Martin Alister Campbell Hinton FRS (29 June 1883 – 3 October 1961) was a British zoologist.

Career
Hinton joined the staff of the Natural History Museum in 1910, working on mammals, in particular rodents. He became Deputy Keeper of Zoology in 1927 and Keeper in 1936, retiring in 1945.

Hinton is among those associated with the Piltdown Man hoax, a composite of an altered human skull and ape jawbone planted, and subsequently 'discovered', at a dig in Piltdown, England, and presented as a missing link between man and ape. A trunk belonging to Hinton left in storage at the Natural History Museum and found in 1970 contained animal bones and teeth carved and stained in a manner similar to the Piltdown finds, and raising questions about Hinton's involvement in the deception.

References

External links
 Web pages and timeline about the Piltdown forgery hosted by the British Geological Survey

English zoologists
1883 births
1961 deaths
Employees of the Natural History Museum, London
Fellows of the Royal Society
20th-century British zoologists